Fitun Estudante Lorosae (in Tetum mean Star students of the east), commonly known as FIEL  is an East Timorese football club based in Dili. The team plays in the Liga Futebol Amadora.

History
In early 2017, the creation of a third league was considered in East Timor. One of the team that talked about it was FC FIEL.

On 20 April 2017 by the League Futebol Amadora twelve teams were determined who could qualify in a tournament for the second division. One of them was FC FIEL.

The tournament took place from 16 to 31 May 2017. The FC FIEL managed there position on 2018 LFA Segunda with a 2–0 victory against União Tokodede in the match for third place qualification.

Squad list 
Squad list as in August 2020

Head Coach: Mohamad Nico

Honours
Copa Presidente champions : 2004

References

External links
facebook page

Football clubs in East Timor
Football
Association football clubs established in 2001